Willem Frederik Rochussen  (18 December 1832, Amsterdam – 17 July 1912, The Hague) was a Dutch politician. From 5 September 1881 until 23 April 1883 he was Minister of Foreign Affairs of the Netherlands.

See also
List of Dutch politicians

1832 births
1912 deaths
Ministers of Foreign Affairs of the Netherlands
Independent politicians in the Netherlands
19th-century Dutch diplomats
Politicians from Amsterdam

Utrecht University alumni
Leiden University alumni
Dutch nobility
Commanders of the Order of the Netherlands Lion
Knights Grand Cross of the Order of Orange-Nassau